Valdemārpils (called Sasmaka until 1926) is a town in northwestern Latvia, in Talsi Municipality. The town is named after Krišjānis Valdemārs, born in nearby Valdgale parish (then part of Ārlava parish), who was one of the leaders of the First Latvian National Awakening. He is celebrated in the town with a memorial stone. Famous Jewish bibliographer and book collector Ephraim Deinard was born here in 1846.

References

External links
 

Towns in Latvia
1917 establishments in Latvia
Populated places established in 1917
Talsi Municipality